Riza Durmisi (born 8 January 1994) is a Danish professional footballer who plays as a left-back for Spanish club Tenerife, on loan from the Italian club Lazio. He has represented Denmark at several youth levels and made his debut for the senior national team in 2015.

Early life
Durmisi was born in Ishøj, part of the Copenhagen suburbs and started playing football for local club SB 50 Ishøj before moving to the Brøndby IF youth academy. Durmisi is of Albanian heritage from Tetovo, in the former Yugoslavia.

Club career

Brøndby

2012–13 season
Durmisi made his Brøndby debut in a 1–1 home draw against Esbjerg fB on 26 August 2012. He made four total substitute appearances during the season.

2013–14 season
On 24 June 2013, Durmisi signed a three-year contract tying him to the club until summer 2016. Durmisi was promoted to the first team and issued shirt number 17. He became a frequent starter, first as a left winger and later as a left wing-back. On 10 November, he scored his first goal from his position as left wing-back in the 3–0 home victory against AGF. He attracted the attention from foreign scouts, including French Ligue 1 club Toulouse and Turkish giants Fenerbahçe, after scoring 3 goals in 33 matches that season.

2014–15 season
On 31 July 2014, Durmisi made his UEFA Europa League debut, starting in the 3–0 away defeat against Belgian side Club Brugge.

Durmisi revealed during the 2014–15 Christmas break that he was approached by the Football Federation of Macedonia to represent Macedonia internationally, due to his Macedonian roots. However, he said at the same time that representing Denmark was his first priority, should its then-head coach, Morten Olsen, offer him a call-up. In response, Olsen said Durmisi should focus on proving his worth on the pitch rather than in the press, yet nonetheless acknowledged Durmisi was being considered for a call-up. During the winter break in January, Durmisi revealed his ambition was to move to either the Dutch Eredivisie or the German Bundesliga.

2015–16 season
On 2 October 2015, after months of negotiations and after replacing his agent Sedat Duraki, Durmisi signed a contract extension which tied him to the club until the summer 2018. The contract reportedly included a €2 million buyout clause, and was finalized by Durmisi's new agent, Nikalo Jurić. At the end of 2015, Durmisi rewarded for his impressive performance and a great year by winning the 2015 Brøndby IF Player of the Year award ahead of such players as Daniel Agger and Thomas Kahlenberg. By the end of March, Durmisi revealed he was receiving significant attention from clubs all across Europe, also stating his expectation that the 2015–16 would be his last for Brøndby. He also added his overall objective is to eventually play for Real Madrid.

Real Betis

2016–17 season
On 28 May 2016, Durmisi signed a five-year contract with La Liga club Real Betis after weeks of media rumours. Betis activated Durmisi's €2 million buyout clause with Brøndby, then replaced it with a €20 million buyout clause on a contract tying Durmisi to Betis until summer 2021. He made his debut for the club on 20 August, starting in a 2–6 away loss against Barcelona.

2017–18 season
On 30 April 2018, he scored a goal for Betis as they secured Europa League qualification for the 2018-19 season following a 2-1 La Liga win over Malaga.

Lazio

2018–19 season
On 22 June 2018, Durmisi signed a five-year contract with Lazio. His debut came on 25 August in the 2–0 away loss to Juventus. After struggling in his first season for I Biancocelesti partly due to injuries, he was benched.

Loan to Nice
On 6 December 2019, French club Nice announced that they reached an agreement with Lazio to loan Durmisi from January 2020 until the end of the 2019–20 season. After his debut on 5 January 2020 in a 2–0 win over Fréjus Saint-Raphaël in the Coupe de France, Durmisi managed only to make five league appearances for the rest of the season, before returning to Lazio.

Loan to Salernitana
On 22 January 2021, he was loaned to Serie B club Salernitana. He ended his six-month loan with only five appearances, all as a substitute.

He returned to Lazio ahead of the 2021–22 season, where he was not called up by new coach Maurizio Sarri for the second phase of the January training camp and consequently remained on the fringes of the squad.

Loan to Sparta Rotterdam
On 31 January 2022, Durmisi joined Dutch Eredivisie club Sparta Rotterdam on loan until the end of the season.

Loans to Leganés and Tenerife
On 1 September 2022, Durmisi moved to Leganés in Spanish Segunda División on a season-long loan.

On 30 January 2023, Durmisi moved to a new loan to Tenerife, also in the Segunda División.

International career
On 8 June 2015, Durmisi made his senior international debut for Denmark in a 2–1 home friendly win against Montenegro at the Viborg Stadion, as a 72nd-minute substitute for Simon Poulsen. Durmisi played the final seven matches in Morten Olsen's lengthy tenure as national team head coach.

In the Euro qualifiers game against Albania in 2015, Durmisi revealed that he would have liked to have played for Albania, being of Albanian heritage from Tetovo. He revealed that he never got a call up from FSHF and that even the Football Federation of Macedonia had sent him an invitation, in which he refused.

On 1 March 2016, after Åge Hareide replaced Olsen, Hareide called-up Durmisi for his first two matches in charge, against Iceland and Scotland on 24 and 29 March respectively. He started and played the full 90 minutes in both matches as a left wing-back in Hareide's 3–5–2 formation.

In May 2018 he was named in Denmark’s preliminary 35-man squad for the 2018 World Cup in Russia. However, he did not make the final 23.

Career statistics

Honours
Lazio
Coppa Italia: 2018–19

Individual
 Brøndby IF Player of the Year 2015

References

External links
 Riza Durmisi DBU-statistics
 

1994 births
People from Ishøj Municipality
Sportspeople from the Capital Region of Denmark
Living people
Association football fullbacks
Danish men's footballers
Denmark youth international footballers
Denmark under-21 international footballers
Denmark international footballers
Ishøj IF players
Brøndby IF players
Real Betis players
S.S. Lazio players
OGC Nice players
U.S. Salernitana 1919 players
Sparta Rotterdam players
CD Leganés players
CD Tenerife players
Danish Superliga players
La Liga players
Serie A players
Ligue 1 players
Serie B players
Eredivisie players
Segunda División players
Danish people of Albanian descent
Danish expatriate men's footballers
Danish expatriate sportspeople in Spain
Danish expatriate sportspeople in Italy
Danish expatriate sportspeople in France
Danish expatriate sportspeople in the Netherlands
Expatriate footballers in Spain
Expatriate footballers in Italy
Expatriate footballers in France
Expatriate footballers in the Netherlands